Brookside Park is a major neighborhood in Pasadena, California. Its northern end is sometimes called Arroyo Terrace. It is Pasadena's second largest neighborhood by area, and its second most sparsely populated.
The neighborhood is bordered by Oak Grove Drive to the north, the Arroyo Seco Canyon wall to the south, Linda Vista Avenue to the West, and Forest and Rosemont Avenues to the East.

Landmarks

The Arroyo Seco runs the length of the Brookside Park. At the very center of the neighborhood is the Rose Bowl, at the southern end is Brookside Park (the actual park) and the Gamble House, and at the northern end is the Brookside Golf Course. Colorado Street Bridges runs over Brookside Park.

Attractions
 The Jackie Robinson Field is located at Brookside Park, next to the Rose Bowl where the UCLA Bruins play home football games
 Brookside Golf Course
 Kidspace Children's Museum
 Rose Bowl Aquatics Center
 Rosemont Pavilion and Brookside Pavilion where Rose Parade floats are decorated and viewed

Education
Despite its odd shape, almost all of Brookside Park is served by Grover Cleveland Elementary School, Eliot and Washington Middle Schools, and John Muir High School. Chandler School is a private school in the neighborhood.

Transportation
Brookside Park is served solely by Pasadena ARTS routes 51 and 52.

References

Neighborhoods in Pasadena, California